Yves-Marie-Henri Bescond (19 May 1924 – 23 August 2018) was a French prelate of the Catholic Church.

Bescond was born in Clamart and ordained a priest on 29 June 1949. Bescond was appointed auxiliary bishop to the Diocese of Corbeil, as well as Titular bishop of Aquae Thibilitanae, on 26 January 1971 and ordained bishop on 28 March 1971. Bescond was appointed auxiliary bishop to the Diocese of Meaux on 12 July 1979 and resigned on 20 October 1986. He died on 23 August 2018.

References

Catholic-Hierarchy 
Meaux Diocese 

1924 births
2018 deaths
People from Clamart
20th-century Roman Catholic bishops in France
French Roman Catholic titular bishops
Auxiliary bishops of Meaux